Hannah Stodel (born 26 August 1985) is a British Paralympic sailor. Stodel has represented Great Britain at three Summer Paralympics and with her colleagues John Robertson and Stephen Thomas has won multiple medals in the Mixed Sonar class at the Disabled Sailing World Championships, including gold in 2005 and 2006.

Personal life
Stodel was born in 1985, growing up in the coastal village of West Mersea, in south-east England. She was born without a lower right arm. Stodel matriculated to Loughborough University where she studied Sport & Exercise Science.

Sailing career
Stodel was introduced to sailing at the age of three, her first boat being a Mirror. Stodel has stated that due to her disability she was bullied as a child, and she used sailing as an escape from the pain. In 1995 she joined the Royal Yachting Association Mirror National Junior Squad, a predominantly able bodied team, as she felt disability events were a weaker option.

Her sailing career path changed after receiving a phone call from Andy Cassell, a British Paralympic sailor. He invited Stodel to a sailing weekend where he argued that disability competitions were not a lesser form of sailing and that by switching from mainstream competitions more opportunities would become available to her. Stodel was won over by Cassell and in 2003 she switched class to sonar competing in disability events. She teamed up with fellow British sailors John Robertson and Stephen Thomas and in 2003 they secured the bronze medal at the IFDS World Disabled Sailing Championship in Athens. The following year the trio qualified for their first Summer Paralympics, finishing sixth in the Sonar class.

Stodel, Robertson and Thomas would remain as a team for over 12 years, with major successes coming in the 2005 World Championships in Sonderborg and the 2006 World Championships in Perth where they took gold in their class. They represented Britain in their second Paralympics, in the 2008 Games in Beijing. They again finished sixth. Two silver medals in the 2010 and 2011 IFDS World Championships were followed by their third successive Paralympics, this time on home surf when the games came to London. The London Paralympics ended in disappointment for Stodel and her team mates after they were deducted four points after a team bosun cleaned the port side of their keel after being authorized to inspect the craft for damage. The deduction saw the British team drop to fifth and the bronze medal going to Norway, just three points ahead of them.

In the run up to the 2016 Summer Paralympics in Rio, Stodel was part of a third World Championship winning Sonar team, beating the Australian team by a single point.

References

External links
 
 

1985 births
Living people
Paralympic sailors of Great Britain
British female sailors (sport)
Sailors at the 2004 Summer Paralympics
Sailors at the 2008 Summer Paralympics
Sailors at the 2012 Summer Paralympics
People from West Mersea
Sportspeople from Colchester
Sportspeople from Essex
Alumni of Loughborough University